Gabare Glacier is the  long and  wide glacier in Petvar Heights on the southeast side of Sentinel Range in Ellsworth Mountains, Antarctica situated northwest of Divdyadovo Glacier, northeast of the head of Carey Glacier, and southeast of Drama Glacier.  It is flowing eastwards to leave the range east-southeast of Long Peak.

The feature is named after the settlement of Gabare in northwestern Bulgaria.

Location
US mapping in 1988.

See also
 List of glaciers in the Antarctic
 Glaciology

Maps
 Vinson Massif.  Scale 1:250 000 topographic map.  Reston, Virginia: US Geological Survey, 1988.
 Antarctic Digital Database (ADD). Scale 1:250000 topographic map of Antarctica. Scientific Committee on Antarctic Research (SCAR). Since 1993, regularly updated.

References
 Gabare Glacier SCAR Composite Antarctic Gazetteer
 Bulgarian Antarctic Gazetteer. Antarctic Place-names Commission. (details in Bulgarian, basic data in English)

External links
 Gabare Glacier. Copernix satellite image

Glaciers of Ellsworth Land
Bulgaria and the Antarctic